Choi Soon-dal (b. 1931 June 20 in Daegu – d. 2014 October 18 in Seoul) was a scientist who pioneered South Korea's satellite-building program and greatly advanced Korea into the new digital information era.

Choi was instrumental in helping the Electronics and Telecommunications Research Institute develop the Electronic Switching System (TDX), the world's tenth such system, which propelled Korea to join the digital information era. He served as a minister in the Ministry of Information and Communication (South Korea).  He was the visionary first dean of the Korean Institute of Technology, which later became a part of KAIST.   As a professor at KAIST, he created the KAIST Satellite Technology Research Center and led a collaboration with students from KAIST and the University of Surrey to successfully engineer the first Korean satellite, KITSAT-1, also named "Our Star."  The satellite was successfully launched from the Guiana Space Center in 1992.

Choi became a member of the Royal Swedish Academy of Engineering Sciences in 1985.

Choi died on October 18, 2014, at the age of 83.
He was posthumously awarded a national medal of honor for his contribution to science and technology on October 21, 2014.   He is the fourth civilian allowed to be buried at the National Cemetery in Daejon.

He is survived by his wife, Hong Hae Jung, and his four children. He has six grandchildren who currently reside in the United States.

References

South Korean scientists
1931 births
2014 deaths
Seoul National University alumni
University of California, Berkeley alumni
Stanford University alumni
Academic staff of KAIST